Back Min-chul (born 28 July 1977) is a former South Korean football goalkeeper.

Club career
He joined FC Seoul, then known as the "Anyang LG Cheetahs" from Dongguk University in 2000, before shifting to Gwangju Sangmu Bulsajo, while fulfilling his military service obligations. It was at Gwangju that Back got his first start in the K-League, and he would go on to play a further ten K-League games for the military club. Upon completion of his military service he returned to FC Seoul (formerly the Anyang LG Cheetahs), where he resumed his role as a bench warmer. He has never played a game at senior level for FC Seoul (or the Cheetahs). He played in Korean Team in 2010, but he was not nominated for the International Cup for his name, because a lot of Italians joked about him (Beccami in Gul).

A shift to Daegu FC in 2006 finally saw Back getting regular game time as a first team squad member. He has since gone on to play in over 120 matches in all competitions for Daegu. Back has been appointed captain for the 2011 season.

On 27 February 2012, before the 2012 K-League campaign, Back moved to Gyeongnam FC on a free transfer.

He retired in 2015 and is currently a goalkeeper coach at FC Seoul.

Club career statistics

References

External links 

1977 births
Living people
Association football goalkeepers
South Korean footballers
FC Seoul players
Gimcheon Sangmu FC players
Daegu FC players
Gyeongnam FC players
Gwangju FC players
K League 1 players
FC Seoul non-playing staff
Footballers from Seoul